The L-KO Kompany, or L-KO Komedies, was an American motion picture company founded by Henry Lehrman that produced silent one-, two- and very occasionally three-reel comedy shorts between 1914 and 1919. The initials L-KO stand for "Lehrman KnockOut".

History
 
By the spring of 1914, Henry "Pathé" Lehrman had directed several important Keystone Kops comedies including The Bangville Police (1913) and Kid Auto Races at Venice (1914), Charlie Chaplin's debut. Wooed away from Mack Sennett by producer Fred J. Balshofer, Lehrman left Keystone, along with star performer Ford Sterling, to found Sterling Comedies under the umbrella of the Universal Film and Manufacturing Co., later Universal Pictures. After a relatively short time, Lehrman was fired from Sterling Comedies as well and founded L-KO as a separate unit within Universal. L-KO's first comedy star was veteran English comic Billie Ritchie, who had played the role of the drunk in Fred Karno's stage production A Night in the English Music Hall before Chaplin did. Ritchie made his film debut in the first L-KO production, Love and Surgery, which was released October 25, 1914. Also making their first films in this venture were Gertrude Selby, a comedian who became the main female foil in L-KO comedies, and Fatty Voss, L-KO's answer to Roscoe "Fatty" Arbuckle. Louise Orth, who had appeared in some Biograph comedies and would go on to appear in many L-KO's, was also aboard for the first release. Before long this group of performers was joined by Hank Mann and other disaffected talent from Mack Sennett's "fun factory," such as Alice Howell, Harry Gribbon and ultimately Mack Swain, whose "Ambrose" character continued at L-KO for a time. Henry Bergman had made one picture with Phillips Smalley before turning up at L-KO; not long after he would join Charlie Chaplin's regular troupe of character actors. 

Lehrman proved even more frugal with budget than Sennett had been, and he favored a rough-and-tumble style of slapstick that reputedly resulted in injury. Author Kalton C. Lahue reported that there were stunt persons and bit players of the time who would not answer a call from L-KO owing to the possibility of danger; stuntman Harvey Parry referred to him as '"Suicide" Lehrman.' Lehrman eventually brought on directors John G. Blystone, Harry Edwards and David Kirkland to help raise the total output of L-KO, but stingily refused to award directors credit for L-KO films.

As the result of yet another dispute—this time with executives at Universal—Lehrman left L-KO towards the end of 1916 and took over the Sunshine Comedies unit at Fox. After Lehrman's departure, L-KO was taken over by Julius and Abe Stern -- brothers-in-law to Universal's founder Carl Laemmle -- and they named John G. Blystone director-in-chief. Blystone headed L-KO for a few months but he ultimately went to Fox Sunshine as well. L-KO nonetheless kept going for quite some time and proved a valuable training ground for new or developing comedy talent. Director Charles Parrott, better known as Charley Chase, came onto the L-KO lot in August 1918 and directed a few subjects through to near the end of L-KO's existence. Dapper comic Raymond Griffith made his film debut at L-KO in 1915 and comedian Eva Novak did so in 1917. Even Fatty Voss managed to direct one two-reeler, Fatty's Feature Fillum, just before his untimely death in 1917, his whole film career spent at L-KO. What finally brought around the end of L-KO was not Lehrman's departure, nor declining receipts for L-KO's product, but an outbreak of the Spanish influenza bug on the lot that forced Universal to shut the whole studio down. L-KO's last release, An Oriental Romeo (1919) starring Chinese funnyman Chai Hong, was released on September 24, 1919, but the studio had already been closed for good in May.

Legacy

While L-KO never had a break-out star as prominent as Charlie Chaplin, in nearly every other way it was successful in competing with Keystone; moreover, as Mack Sennett broke with the Triangle Film Corporation in July, 1917, L-KO managed to outlast Keystone by a year. However, it remains an extremely obscure Silent Comedy brand. Although L-KO produced around 300 titles in its five-year existence; little more than 10 percent of these films are known to exist today. Given Lehrman's preference for violent sight gags and Ritchie's confrontational style of humor, surviving L-KO films stand as some of the edgiest and darkest entries in the annals of American Silent Comedy.

See also

Henry Lehrman

Confirmed extant films

References

Simon Louvish, Keystone: The Life and Clowns of Mack Sennett, Faber & Faber, New York, 2003.

External links
 IMDB entry on L-KO
 Museum of MOdern Art (MOMA), Cruel and Unusual Comedy Blog
Images Journal: Slapstick Encyclopedia Vol. 4 
Cincecon screening:  The Sign of the Cucumber
Slapsticon bio: Billie Ritchie

Entertainment companies established in 1914
Mass media companies established in 1914
Mass media companies disestablished in 1919
Silent film studios
Defunct American film studios
American companies established in 1914